Damian Matthias Armin Wierling (born 13 February 1996) is a German swimmer. He competed in the men's 50 metre freestyle, 100 metre freestyle, 4 × 100 metre freestyle relay and 4 × 100 metre medley relay events at the 2016 Summer Olympics. At the 2020 Olympic Games, he competed in the 100 metre freestyle, 4 x 100 metre freestyle relay, and 4 x 100 metre medley relay.

References

External links
 
 
 
 
 

1996 births
Living people
German male swimmers
Olympic swimmers of Germany
Swimmers at the 2016 Summer Olympics
Swimmers at the 2020 Summer Olympics
Swimmers at the 2014 Summer Youth Olympics
German male freestyle swimmers
European Aquatics Championships medalists in swimming
Sportspeople from Essen